12 Blues is a 10-acre private island located in the Maldives archipelago. This island is 90 miles north of Male and accessible by a 35-minute sea plane journey. 12 Blues is also the world's first hotel residences offered for sale by the government of the Maldives. On 11 October 2011, the President of the Republic of Maldives Mohamed Nasheed attended the groundbreaking of the 12 Blues, confirming the government's support for foreign investment in the Islands. The hotel residences were expected to open in 2012.

References

External links
12 Blues official website

2011 establishments in the Maldives
Hotels established in 2012
Resorts in the Maldives
Private islands of Asia
Islands of the Maldives